Marcus Wyatt may also refer to:

Marcus Wyatt (musician) (born 1971), South African musician
Marcus Wyatt (skeleton racer) (born 1991), British skeleton racer